A break clause is a term in a contract that allows early termination of the contract before the default end date. In accordance with  English property law, such clauses are typical in tenancy agreements, so as to allow a tenancy to come to an end before the end date stated in the agreement. A break clause may be invoked by either the landlord or the tenant.

See also
 Citizens Advice Bureau
 Consumer Rights Act 2015  (Parts 2 and 3)
 Unfair Contract Terms Act 1977

References

English property law
Contract clauses